The Taal Basilica, canonically known as the Minor Basilica of Saint Martin of Tours (Filipino: Basilika ni San Martin ng Tours; Spanish: Basílica Menor de San Martín de Tours), is a minor basilica in the town of Taal, Batangas, within the Archdiocese of Lipa. Martin of Tours is the patron saint of Taal, whose feast is celebrated every November 11.

History

Earlier churches

In 1575, three years after the founding of the town of Taal in its old site near the shores of Taal Lake, work began on the construction of its first church by Father Diego Espinar, O.S.A., with Martin of Tours as patron saint. The church was rebuilt in 1642 using stronger materials, but it was destroyed in 1754 along with the town of Taal in the largest recorded eruption of the Taal Volcano. This event led to transfer of the town and the church farther away from the volcano to its present site atop an elevated hill facing Balayan Bay. The ruins of the previous church can still be seen in the present-day town of San Nicolas.

Father Martín Aguirre donated the land and began the construction of the new church in 1755. It was continued by Father Gabriel Rodriguez in 1777 and by Father Jose Victoria in 1782. Father Ramon del Marco decorated the church, built the convent, and paved the "processional" road with bricks around the atrium of the parochial building. This church was damaged by a strong earthquake on September 16, 1852, centered near the Taal Volcano, though no volcanic eruption was recorded.

Present church 

Construction of the present church began in 1856 by Father Marcos Antón with Spanish architect Luciano Oliver, commissioned to design and manage the construction of the new church. Although it was unfinished, it was inaugurated in 1865. He was also responsible for the baptistery made with tiles imported from Europe. The stone church had three naves with a grand transept and an elegant façade with Ionic and Doric orders. A small tower on the left side of the façade contained the large church bell, which in 1942 was destroyed by an earthquake.

Minor Basilica and further renovations

The church was then restored in 1953 in preparation for the canonical coronation of the Our Lady of Caysasay. The following year on December 8, 1954, the church was declared as a minor basilica, the third in the country to be given such honor. The church was again restored in 1972 by the Taal Quadricentennial Council for the 400th anniversary of the town's establishment. By Presidential Decree No. 375 on January 16, 1974, the church was declared a national shrine.

The old belfry was later rebuilt in 1990 under the supervision of the National Historical Institute. In 2011, upon the assignment of Monsignor Alfredo Madlangbayan, the basilica underwent another renovation as sections the church interior were repainted to match its original trompe l'oeil ceilings. The tower was also modified to imitate the old tower destroyed by the earthquake of 1942, and a new set of carillon bells was later installed. The renovations was completed in November that same year.

On April 4, 2017, the basilica was damaged by a magnitude-5.5 earthquake that struck Tingloy. The basilica was significantly damaged further by twin earthquakes (magnitudes 5.6 and 6.0) that struck the neighboring towns of Mabini and Taysan that occurred four days later on April 8. The National Historical Commission of the Philippines is undertaking some precautionary measures in order to preserve the basilica.

Gallery

Notes

References

External links

 Taal Basilica Info Web Page
 St. Martin of Tours Brochure. Diocese of Lipa.

Basilica churches in the Philippines
Roman Catholic churches in Batangas
Buildings and structures in Taal, Batangas
Marked Historical Structures of the Philippines
National Historical Landmarks of the Philippines
Spanish Colonial architecture in the Philippines
Baroque church buildings in the Philippines
Neoclassical church buildings in the Philippines
Churches in the Roman Catholic Archdiocese of Lipa